The Black Spot is a 1914 British silent thriller film directed by George Loane Tucker and starring Jane Gail, Charles Rock, and Gerald Ames.

Cast
 Jane Gail as Olga Scerloff 
 Arthur Holmes-Gore as Duke Paul 
 Charles Rock as Professor Scerloff 
 Gerald Ames as Serge Malkow

References

Bibliography
 Brian McFarlane & Anthony Slide. The Encyclopedia of British Film: Fourth Edition. Oxford University Press, 2013.

External links
 

1914 films
1910s thriller films
British silent feature films
British thriller films
Films directed by George Loane Tucker
British black-and-white films
1910s English-language films
1910s British films
Silent thriller films